Cosmic Bomb (foaled 1944) was an American Thoroughbred racehorse whose wins included races that today would be graded events. He is also remembered as the sire of broodmare  Cosmah, the 1974 Kentucky Broodmare of the Year who produced Halo, who in turn sired 1983 Kentucky Derby winner Sunny's Halo and U.S. Racing Hall of Fame inductee Sunday Silence. Cosmah also produced Queen Sucree, the dam of Kentucky Derby winner Cannonade.

Cosmic Bomb sired a number of stakes race winners including Federal Hill, winner of the 1956 Kentucky Jockey Club Stakes, the 1957 Louisiana Derby and the 1957 Derby Trial Stakes. Federal Hill set a world record 1:15.00 for six and one-half furlongs on dirt at Gulfstream Park.

References
 Cosmic Bomb's pedigree and partial racing stats

1944 racehorse births
Racehorses bred in Kentucky
Racehorses trained in the United States
Thoroughbred family 14-f